Jonah and Co. is a 1922 collection of comic short stories by the English author Dornford Yates (Cecil William Mercer), featuring his recurring 'Berry' characters.

Plot 
Berry, Daphne, Jonah, Jill, Boy and Adèle (with Nobby the Sealyham) travel by road through France to winter in Pau. While staying there they venture into northern Spain. 

Boy and Adèle are newly married. Jill meets her future husband, Piers, Duke of Padua.

Background 
This was a happy period in Mercer's life; he had acquired a villa in Pau in South-west France, and his characters followed him there. It became the Mercer family's permanent home in 1922 after the book was published.

All of the stories in Jonah and Co. had originally appeared in  The Windsor Magazine between October 1921 and September 1922, although the original editions of the book (until c. 1925) included a Prologue and Epilogue that had not been included in the magazine. These were subsequently reprinted in The Best of Berry (Dent's Classic Thrillers, 1989) as The Gypsy's Warning and The Fairy Child respectively.

Chapters

Illustrations 

The illustrations from the Windsor stories by Norah Schlegel (1879-1963) were not included in the book version.

Critical reception 
Jonah and Co. was as commercially successful as Berry and Co. had been. In his 1982 biography of the author, AJ Smithers considered that Berry remains dauntlessly funny, and at the top of his form: "A merry journey over the long roads of France ... and all written with the freshness of one who was discovering these things for the first time."

References

Bibliography
 
 

1922 short story collections
Ward, Lock & Co. books
Short story collections by Dornford Yates